Nicolas Mahut and Édouard Roger-Vasselin were the defending champions, but Mahut decided not to participate.
Roger-Vasselin played alongside Benoît Paire, but lost in the first round to Johan Brunström and Raven Klaasen.
Marc Gicquel and Michaël Llodra won the title, defeating Brunström and Klaasen 6–3, 3–6, [11–9] in the final.

Seeds

Draw

Draw

References 
 Main Draw

O
Doubles